The Bottom of the Lake is the third album by Melbourne band Tinpan Orange, released on Vitamin Records in 2009. The album was produced by Harry Angus of The Cat Empire, and Angus also plays several instruments on the album. "Lovely" was released as a single.

Track listing 

(All tracks by Emily Lubitz except where noted)

"Romeo Don't Come" – 3:43
"The Bottom of the Lake" – 5:14
"La La La" – 3:09
"Chinese Whispers" – 4:28
"Round and Round" (Jesse Lubitz) – 3:28
"Lovely" – 3:51
"Song for Frida Kahlo" – 3:41
"Another Town" – 3:37
"Fitzroy St" (Jesse Lubitz) – 3:53
"Every Single Day" – 4:32
"Peppercorn Trees" – 3:51
"Saudades" – 4:06

Personnel
Emily Lubitz – vocals, guitar, ukulele
Jesse Lubitz – guitar, vocals
Alex Burkoy – violin, mandolin, guitar, bass, ukulele
Harry Angus – harmonium, piano, whistles, keyboard, percussion, guitar
Lara, Rita, Lionel and Adam Lubitz – backing vocals

Technical personnel
Harry Angus – producer and engineer
Jesse Lubitz – engineer
Adam Rhodes – mixing
Ross Cockle – mastering
Rachel Stone – cover art

References 

2009 albums
Tinpan Orange albums